Chalastinus is a genus of beetles in the family Cerambycidae, containing the following species:

 Chalastinus egensis (White, 1855)
 Chalastinus pantherinus Lacordaire, 1872
 Chalastinus recticornis Bates, 1875

References

Anisocerini